Letestu is a surname. Notable people with the surname include:

 Agnès Letestu (born 1971), French danseuse
 Mark Letestu (born 1985), Canadian ice hockey player
 Marcel Letestu (1918–2006), French Army officer